The Croatian Coast Guard is a division of the Croatian Navy responsible for protecting the interests of the Republic of Croatia at sea. The Croatian Navy is composed of classical naval forces structured into a flotilla and the Coast Guard that solely consists of ships with peacetime duties, e.g. protection of ecology, fishing, control of tankers, ballast waters, combat against terrorism, trafficking of people, narcotics, and similar.

History and Mission 
On September 13, 2007, the Croatian Parliament passed a bill establishing the Croatian Coast Guard. The Coast Guard's mission is protect sovereign rights and carry out Croatia's jurisdiction in the Ecological and Fisheries Protection Zone, the continental shelf and the high seas. The Coast Guard will also monitor vessels sailing in the Croatian territorial waters. If vessels are caught violating Croatian or international regulations and disregard warnings by the Coast Guard, Coast Guard ships and airplanes are authorized to pursue them and if necessary open fire, while taking care not to jeopardize the lives of the vessel's crew.

Under the law, the commander of the Coast Guard is a Navy officer who is appointed and relieved of duty by the President of the Republic at the government's proposal.

Organizational structure and vessels 

Ships of Croatian Navy under the Command of Coast Guard:
Coast Guard Command
1st Division - Split
OB-01 Novigrad
OB-02 Šolta
OB-31 Omiš
BŠ-72 Andrija Mohorovičić
SB-73 Faust Vrančić
PT-71 Meduza
Tug LR-71 
Modrulj 1 
2nd Division - Pula
OB-03 Cavtat
OB-04 Hrvatska Kostajnica
Tug LR-73
Modrulj 2

Croatian part of Adriatic Sea is also controlled by Croatian Police - Maritime department and Harbormasters’ offices (Lučka kapetanija) whose ships are marked similar to Navy ships.

Besides the warships, the Coast Guard has at its disposal two Pilatus PC-9 aircraft and four Mil Mi-8 helicopters of the Croatian Air Force and Defense.

Current fleet status

The cornerstone of the Coast Guard forces are four former Yugoslav Mirna class patrol boats (OB-01 through 04). They have recently been upgraded with new radars and their stern anti-aircraft guns have been replaced with hoists for a semi-rigid inflatable. These are to be augmented and eventually replaced by an entirely new class. Coast Guard possess one new offshore patrol ship OOB-31 Omiš built in Brodosplit which is lead ship in future class.

Future developments

Construction of the first out of the projected 5 shore patrol vessels (additional 10 were planned for later) was scheduled to start in 2007, however due to the onset of the economic crisis the international tender for the construction of 1 + 4 vessels was published only on April 24, 2013. The tender calls for the acquisition of a total of 5 inshore patrol ships (Croatian obalni ophodni brod, OOB) which are to be 43.5 meters long, with a displacement of roughly 220 tons and a maximum sustained speed of at least 28 knots. They are to be armed with a 30 mm Aselsan SMASH Remote weapon station as their main armament along with two 12,7 mm heavy machine guns and 4 MANPADS launchers. The tender was completed in May 2014 and the construction of the first ship was to start in the last quarter of the same year. As projected, the first vessel was to enter service in 2015, the second one in 2016, the third and the fourth in 2017 and the last one in 2018. Units are projected to cost around 10 million euros respectively (375 million kuna for first 5 ships). However, the first ship (prototype) was laid down in September 2015 and is expected to be launched and commissioned in the beginning of 2017. In a TV interview in October 2016, Croatian Navy commander, rear-admiral Stipanović, stated that Croatian Coast Guard would eventually need additional 10 inshore patrol vessels (on top of five planned and ordered) to be fully operational.

Gallery

See also
 Croatian Navy
 Port captaincies of the Republic of Croatia

References

External links
CCG live fire exercise "Prstac 16", 2016. YouTube.

Croatian Navy
Coast guards
Military units and formations established in 2007
2007 establishments in Croatia